De L'Église station is a Montreal Metro station in the borough of Verdun in Montreal, Quebec, Canada. It is operated by the Société de transport de Montréal (STM) and serves the Green Line. The station opened on September 3, 1978, as part of the extension of the Green Line westward to Angrignon station.

Architecture and art 

Designed by Jean-Maurice Dubé, it was planned as a normal side platform station. However, during the station's construction, a cave-in of the surrounding weak Utica Shale formation made it necessary to build the station with a narrower profile. It is therefore built with stacked platforms, with the Honoré-Beaugrand platform above and Angrignon below, and both directions opening to the left instead of the usual right. There are two accesses, one in the centre and one at the western end of the station, with separate ticket halls.

The station is decorated with a series of circular motifs in ceramic tile on the lower levels and concrete bas-reliefs in the upper levels by Claude Théberge and Antoine D. Lamarche

Origin of the name
This station is named for Rue de l'Église, in turn named for the Église Notre-Dame-des-Sept-Douleurs near the station. (The roadway continues into Côte-Saint-Paul under the name Avenue de l'Église, itself named for the Église Saint-Paul in that neighbourhood.) This roadway has existed since at least 1834; the portion in Verdun, previously called rue du Pavillon, became known as rue de l'Église or Church Street following the construction of the first Église Notre-Dame-des-Sept-Douleurs in 1899.

Connecting bus routes

Nearby points of interest
 Hôpital de Verdun
 Verdun Auditorium
 Parc Thérien
 Health Canada
Plage de Verdun

References

External links

 De L'Église Station - official site
 Montreal by Metro, metrodemontreal.com - photos, information, and trivia
 STM 2011 System Map

Green Line (Montreal Metro)
Verdun, Quebec
Railway stations in Canada opened in 1978